Clostridioides is a genus of Gram-positive bacteria, which includes Clostridioides difficile, a human pathogen causing an infectious diarrhea.


Taxonomy
The genus Clostridioides was created to describe a few species formerly in the genus Clostridium which have been shown to be their own genetically distinct genus using 16S rRNA gene sequencing analysis. However, both names are still in use and valid under the International Code of Nomenclature of Prokaryotes.

Description
They are obligate anaerobes capable of producing endospores. The normal, reproducing cells of Clostridioides, called the vegetative form, are rod-shaped, which gives them their name, from the Greek κλωστήρ or spindle. Clostridioides endospores, like Clostridium endospores, have a distinct bowling pin or bottle shape, distinguishing them from other bacterial endospores, which are usually ovoid in shape.

References

Peptostreptococcaceae
Gram-positive bacteria
Gut flora bacteria
Pathogenic bacteria
Bacteria genera
Taxa described in 2016